Juraj Kolník (born November 13, 1980) is a Slovak former professional ice hockey forward, who last played for the Jonquière Marquis of the Ligue Nord-Américaine de Hockey.

Kolník has previously played in the National Hockey League (NHL), appearing in 176 games between the New York Islanders and Florida Panthers. He was selected by the Islanders in the fourth round, 101st overall, in the 1999 NHL Entry Draft.

In 2015, Kolnik signed with the Nottingham Panthers in the Elite Ice Hockey League (EIHL).

Career statistics

Regular season and playoffs

International

References

External links

Juraj Kolník at Yahoo Sports

1980 births
Living people
Bridgeport Sound Tigers players
Dynamo Balashikha players
HC Dynamo Moscow players
Florida Panthers players
GCK Lions players
Genève-Servette HC players
Lowell Lock Monsters players
New York Islanders draft picks
New York Islanders players
HK Nitra players
Sportspeople from Nitra
Nottingham Panthers players
Quebec Remparts players
SC Rapperswil-Jona Lakers players
Rimouski Océanic players
San Antonio Rampage players
SCL Tigers players
Slovak expatriate ice hockey players in Russia
Slovak ice hockey right wingers
Springfield Falcons players
ZSC Lions players
Slovak expatriate ice hockey players in the United States
Slovak expatriate ice hockey players in Canada
Slovak expatriate ice hockey players in Switzerland
Slovak expatriate sportspeople in England
Expatriate ice hockey players in England